The South African Film and Television Awards (SAFTA), also known as the Golden Horns, are awards for film and television presented in South Africa and first given out in 2006. They are awarded by the National Film and Video Foundation of South Africa (NFVF). The categories that are awarded at the jury's discretion are marked by a diesis.

Television

TV Drama

TV Soap

TV Comedy

TV Non-Fiction

Wildlife
 Best Wildlife Programme: since 2007
 Best Producer in a Wildlife Programme: since 2012 
 Best Editing in a Wildlife Programme: since 2012 
 Best Cinematography in a Wildlife Programme: since 2012 
 Best Directing in a Wildlife Programme: since 2013 
 Best Music in a Wildlife Programme: since 2015

Made For TV Movie

Film

Feature films

Documentaries
 Best Documentary Feature: since 2006
 Best Cinematography in a Documentary Feature: since 2007 
 Best Directing in a Documentary Feature: since 2014 
 Best Editing in a Documentary Feature: since 2014 
 Best Sound in a Documentary Feature: since 2015

Student and Short films

Animation
 Best Animation: since 2007

Public Voting
 Best TV Soap: 2006 – 2015
 Best Dressed Character: only 2009
 Best Comedic Character: only 2009
 Best Hero/Heroine Character: only 2009
 Best Villain/Villainess Character: only 2009
 Best TV Presenter: since 2015
 Most Popular TV Soap: since 2015

Special awards
 Lifetime Achievement Award: since 2009 
 Newcomer Award: since 2009 
 Outstanding Contributor Award: since 2016 
 Disability Recognition Award: since 2016 

Other special awards may be awarded at the discretion of the SAFTA Executive and Judging Committees.

See also
 List of television awards

References

South African film awards
Lists of television awards
South African television awards
Award categories
Award categories